Merthyr Tydfil was a parliamentary constituency centred on the town of Merthyr Tydfil in Glamorgan.  From 1832 to 1868 it returned one Member of Parliament (MP)  to the House of Commons of the Parliament of the United Kingdom, and in 1868 this was increased to two members.  The two-member constituency was abolished for the 1918 general election.

A single-member constituency (known as Merthyr) existed from 1918 until 1945 and, by the 1950 general election, it had been renamed Merthyr Tydfil. The constituency was abolished for the 1983 general election, when it was largely replaced by the new Merthyr Tydfil and Rhymney constituency.

History
Merthyr was regarded as a Liberal seat throughout the nineteenth century and particularly after the landmark election of 1868. There were tensions within the constituency, however and these were manifested by the rivalry between Merthyr and Aberdare, which became more pronounced as the latter grew in importance after 1850. Increasingly, also, the constituency was affected by the debate about working-class representation. Thomas Halliday contested Merthyr as a 'labour' candidate as early as 1874 and the return of Keir Hardie in 1900 was a notable landmark in the growth of the Labour Party. From 1922 onwards, Merthyr was a safe Labour seat.

1832–1867
The Reform Act 1832 was the first significant review of the arrangements for the election of MPs to the House of Commons, Patterns of representation had remained essentially unchanged for centuries and no recognition was given to the growth of urban settlements in the wake of the industrial revolution. The discontent of the late 1820s, culminating in serious disturbances in 1831, including the Merthyr Rising persuaded the government to take action in favour of reform. Within the Act of 1832 the one significant change in Wales was the carving out of a new parliamentary constituency, centred at Merthyr Tydfil, from the county of Glamorgan.

The Parliamentary Boundaries Act 1832 defined the new Parliamentary Borough of Merthyr Tydvil in great detail:
From the Point on the North of Merthyr Tydvil at which the Northern Boundary of the Hamlet of Gellydeg meets the River called the Great Taff, Northward, along the Great Taff, to the Point at which the same is cut by the Southern Fence of Cilsanos Common; thence, Eastward, along the Fence of Cilsanos Common to the Point at which the same cuts the Brecon Road; thence, Southward, along the Brecon Road to the Point at which the same meets the Vainor Road; thence, Eastward, along the Vainor Road to the Point at which the same meets a Bye Road leading to Cefn-coed-y-Cwymner; thence in a straight Line to the Point at which the Little Taff would be cut by a straight Line to be drawn from the Point last described to the Southern Mouth of a Culvert on the Eastern Side of the Little Taff; thence, up the Little Taff, along the Boundary of the Parish of Merthyr Tydvil to the Point at which the Cwm Bargoed Stream is joined by a little Brook from the Coli Ravine; thence in a straight Line to the North eastern Corner of the Stone Fence of Pen-dwy-cae Vawr Farm; thence along the Road which passes Pen-dwy-cae Vawr Farmhouse to the Point at which the same meets the Mountain Track from Dowlais to Quakers Yard; thence, Southward, along the said Track, between the Farms of Pen-dwy-cae Vach and Pen-dwy-cae Vawr, to the Point at which such Track meets a Road running nearly due West, by a Stone Quarry, to Pen-y-rhw Gymra Cottage; thence along the last-mentioned Road to the Point at which the same reaches the Southern Side of Pen-y-rhw Gymra Cottage; thence in a straight Line to the Point at which the Southern Boundary of Troed-y-rhw Farm meets the Cardiff Road; thence along the Southern Boundary of Troed-y-rhw Farm to the Point at which the same meets the Great Taff; thence in a straight Line to the Bridge over the Cardiff Canal called Pont-y-nant Maen; thence, Northward, along the Cardiff Canal to the Point at which the same is intersected by the Cwmdu Brook; thence along the Cwmdu Brook to its Source; thence in a straight Line drawn due West to the Boundary of the Parish of Aberdare; thence, Southward, along the Boundary of the Parish of Aberdare to the Point at which the same meets the Boundary of the Hamlet of Gellydeg; thence, Eastward, along the Boundary of the Hamlet of Gellydeg to the Point first described.

Electoral Politics 1832–67
When the constituency was established the vast majority of the electorate were resident in Merthyr Tydfil and its environs, such as the industrial township of Dowlais. In contrast the electorate of the neighbouring Aberdare Valley was relatively small, numbering 3,691 compared with 22,083 in Merthyr. The first member for Merthyr Tydfil was Sir Josiah John Guest who served, albeit with some opposition until his death in 1852.

Guest was succeeded by Henry Austin Bruce who, again, served with little opposition until the Second Reform Act of 1867. Bruce was a prominent Liberal although associated with the less radical wing of the Liberal Party and was criticised for his role in events such as the 1857 Aberdare Strike.

1867–1918
The Representation of the People Act 1867, which increased the number of members returned to two, also widened the constituency boundaries. To the existing parliamentary borough were added some additional parts of the parish of Aberdare, part of the parishes of Merthyr and "Faenor" (Vaynor), and part of the district of Mountain Ash.

The same boundaries were retained in 1885, and can be seen on the boundary commissioners' map.

1868 general election
Merthyr Tydfil saw one of the most remarkable contests of the 1868 general election. Resulting directly from a tenfold increase in the electorate. Henry Richard was returned at the expense of the sitting member, Henry Austin Bruce.

Bruce had served as member since 1832 and his position was secure until the reforms of 1867. Even thereafter, the immediate interest appeared to be in who would occupy the second seat rather than whether or nor Bruce would be re-elected. The Merthyr element of the constituency had dominated the representation since its formation in 1832 but in recent years the population of the neighbouring Aberdare valley had grown considerably, mainly as a result of the development of the steam coal trade, that they should determine the identity of the second member. The Merthyr electorate had traditionally been far larger than that of Aberdare but by 1868, Aberdare's electorate formed almost half the total (11,446 in Aberdare; 13,329 in Merthyr). As a result, there was a widespread view amongst the industrialists and tradesmen of the Aberdare Valley that they should have a say in the selection of a second Liberal candidate to contest the seat alongside Bruce.

These commercial interests of the Aberdare Valley soon became allied with the powerful nonconformist interest, which was led by the key figure of Thomas Price, minister of Calfaria, Aberdare. Price, and other nonconformist ministers, were considered to have considerable influence over the largely chapel-going industrial workers who had been newly enfranchised. During 1867 these groupings rallied around Richard Fothergill, owner of the Aberdare Ironworks and also a figure of some influence in Merthyr due to his ownership of the Plymouth Ironworks. It was confidently expected that Fothergill would be returned alongside Bruce.

This remained the position until Henry Richard entered the fray in the summer of 1868. Richard's candidature was also opposed by members of the Irish community, on account of alleged comments by Richard about the Pope during a speech at Brecon.

1868–1888
Richard and Fothergill were re-elected in 1874. By 1879, however, Fothergill was in financial difficulties and there were calls for him to step aside. A deputation of tradesmen and working men who attended a meeting at Swansea to request to offer himself once again as a candidate but he eventually declined. He was replaced by Charles Herbert James. member of a long-standing politically active family in Merthyr. Both served until 1888 when Richard died and James stood down, leading to two by-elections within a twelve-month period. These led to the return of David Alfred Thomas and William Pritchard Morgan. Thomas and Morgan had much in common. Both were nonconformists, both were wealthy industrialists and both placed Welsh issues high on their list of political priorities. However, they also shared 'a hearty loathing' for each other.

Morgan's return, in particular, was significant, in view of the fact that he defeated Foulkes Griffiths, the official candidate of the Liberal Association. The result was also regarded as a defeat for the Cymru Fydd element in the Welsh Liberal Party. The Merthyr Liberal Association broke up after this election and did not function again until 1909.

1888–1918
 
Relations between Thomas and Morgan were not good, leading ultimately to a Liberal split which contributed to the success of Keir Hardie at the 1900 general election. For the first decade of the twentieth century Merthyr was represented by the unusual combination of David Alfred Thomas and Hardie. In 1910, Thomas chose to contest Cardiff instead and was succeeded by Sir Edgar Jones.

1918–1950
The two-member Merthyr Boroughs constituency was replaced at the 1918 general election by two separate constituencies, Aberdare and Merthyr Tydfil.

1950–1983
Merthyr Tydfil Borough Constituency, created by the Representation of the People Act 1948, had an identical area to the County Borough of Merthyr Tydfil. The seat was first contested at the 1950 general election. The boundaries were unchanged until 1983.

Members of Parliament

MPs 1832–1868

MPs 1868–1918

MPs 1950–1983

Elections 1832–1867

Elections in the 1830s

Elections in the 1840s

Elections in the 1850s

Guest's death caused a by-election.

Elections in the 1860s
Bruce was appointed Vice-President of the Committee of the Privy Council for Education, requiring a by-election.

Elections 1868–1918

Elections in the 1860s
Seat increased to two members

Elections in the 1870s

Elections in the 1880s 

 

James resigned, causing a by-election.

Richard died, causing a by-election.

Elections in the 1890s

Elections in the 1900s

Elections in the 1910s

Elections 1950–1979

1950s

1960s

1970s

NB: Davies claimed to be 83 in 1970 and his Constituency Labour Party felt that he was too old and ought to stand down. They thus de-selected him in favour of a younger man. However, although his true birth date is unconfirmed, Davies was undoubtedly several years older than he claimed, and was probably close to 90 years old when he fought and won the election as an Independent.

References

Bibliography
 
 

History of Glamorgan
Historic parliamentary constituencies in South Wales
Constituencies of the Parliament of the United Kingdom established in 1832
Constituencies of the Parliament of the United Kingdom disestablished in 1918
Constituencies of the Parliament of the United Kingdom established in 1950
Constituencies of the Parliament of the United Kingdom disestablished in 1983
Politics of Merthyr Tydfil